Tokaranodicerca is a genus of metallic wood-boring beetles in the family Buprestidae.

References

Further reading

 
 

Buprestidae